is  the assistant coach of the Toyama Grouses in the Japanese B.League.

Head coaching record

|- 
| style="text-align:left;"|Sendai 89ers
| style="text-align:left;"|2018
| 32||8||24||||4th in B2 Eastern|||-||-||-||
|- 
|-

References

External links
Struggling 89ers fire Toshihiro Goto, hand coaching reins to Daisuke Takaoka

1981 births
Living people
Aomori Wat's players
Japanese basketball coaches
Utsunomiya Brex players
Miyazaki Shining Suns players
Otsuka Corporation Alphas players
Sendai 89ers coaches
Sendai 89ers players
Toyama Grouses coaches